Zaviyeh Moradi (also Romanized as Zāvīyeh Morādī and Zāveyeh Morādī) is a village in Qeblehi Rural District, in the Central District of Dezful County, Khuzestan Province, Iran. At the 2006 census, its population was 566, in 106 families.

References 

Populated places in Dezful County